The Parliament Act 1782 (22 Geo. 3. c. 41), also known as Crewe's Act, was an Act of Parliament of the Parliament of Great Britain passed in 1782. The Act, which was passed by Rockingham's government at the instance of John Crewe, disqualified all officers of Customs and Excise and the Post Office from voting in parliamentary elections. The purpose of this disfranchisement was to end the abuse by which government patronage was used to bribe the voters in rotten boroughs such as Bossiney and New Romney. It failed in practice, however, since the patronage was quickly diverted from the voters themselves to their relatives.

It was repealed by the Revenue Officers' Disabilities Act 1868 (31 & 32 Vict. c. 73).

See also
Parliament Act (disambiguation)

References
Edward Porritt and Annie G Porritt. The Unreformed House of Commons. Cambridge University Press, 1903.

Repealed Great Britain Acts of Parliament
Great Britain Acts of Parliament 1782
Elections in the Kingdom of Great Britain